Accretion is the process of coastal sediment returning to the visible portion of a beach or foreshore after a submersion event. A sustainable beach or foreshore often goes through a cycle of submersion during rough weather and later accretion during calmer periods.

If a coastline is not in a healthy sustainable state, erosion can be more serious, and accretion does not fully restore the original volume of the visible beach or foreshore, which leads to permanent beach loss.

Coastal geography
Deposition (geology)
Physical oceanography